Baldivis may refer to:
 Baldivis, Western Australia, a suburb of Perth
 Electoral district of Baldivis, a state electoral district named after the suburb
 Baldivis Secondary College
 Baldivis Tramway, a short-lived tramway